is a professional Japanese baseball player. He is a pitcher for the Hokkaido Nippon-Ham Fighters of Nippon Professional Baseball (NPB).

References 

1999 births
Living people
Nippon Professional Baseball pitchers
Baseball people from Chiba Prefecture
Hokkaido Nippon-Ham Fighters players